The Ship Canal Bridge is a double-deck steel truss bridge that carries Interstate 5 (I-5) over Seattle's Portage Bay (part of the Lake Washington Ship Canal, after which it is named) between Capitol Hill and the University District. The canal below connects Lake Union with Lake Washington.  Construction was completed in 1961 and the bridge opened to traffic on December 18, 1962. It is 4,429 ft (1,350 meters) long, stands 182 feet above the canal and is 119 feet wide at the upper deck. It was the largest bridge of its kind in the Northwest when it first opened. The bridge is double-decked, with the upper deck carrying traffic in both directions and the lower deck (the express lanes) carrying traffic southbound in the morning and northbound in the afternoon.

Other nearby bridges include University Bridge, Montlake Bridge, and George Washington Memorial Bridge (the Aurora Ave. bridge).

See also

References

External links

Bridges in Seattle
Bridges completed in 1961
Double-decker bridges
Road bridges in Washington (state)
Steel bridges in the United States
Truss bridges in the United States
Bridges on the Interstate Highway System
Interstate 5
1962 establishments in Washington (state)